Saskia Olde Wolbers (born 1971) is a Dutch video artist who lives and works in London.

Background

Since the mid-1990s, Saskia Olde Wolbers has been developing fictional documentaries often loosely based on factual events. Her intricate videos are driven by a combination of otherworldly imagery – meticulously handmade model sets – and the apparent inner monologue of the voiceover in the audio book-like soundtrack. The films are shot underwater, miniature sets dipped in paint to create unstable imagery that abstractly illustrates the narrator's thought process. In her most recent works, the music soundtrack has been composed by Daniel Pemberton.

She has exhibited widely since 1998. Solo shows include: A Shot In The Dark at Vienna Secession, 2011; Goetz Collection, 2010; Mori Art Museum Tokyo, 2008; The Falling Eye at The Stedelijk Museum Amsterdam, 2006; and Tate Britain, London, 2003.  In 2014 she created an audio installation at 87 Hackford Road, Brixton, London, the house in which Vincent van Gogh lodged briefly in 1873–74.

Author and curator Phillip Monk describes in his book The Saskia Olde Wolbers Files, "Olde Wolbers not only joins fictional and documentary elements in her scripts, she links them to series of images, themselves fabricated and quite fantastic in their nature."

In 2008, Olde Wolbers lectured for the Penny Stamps Distinguished Speaker Series. 

She is a lecturer at Goldsmiths University.

Awards and prizes
Olde Wolbers has won the Baloise Prize (2003) and the Beck's Futures Prize (2004).

References

Further reading
2011 Saskia Olde Wolbers, A Shot in the Dark, Secession. 
2009 
2009 Automatic cities, The architectural image in contemporary art, Museum of contemporary art San Diego, Distributed by Distributed Art Publishers New York. 
2008 Saskia Olde Wolbers, Mori Art Museum, Tokyo, Japan.  C0071
2008 The Cinema Effect: Illusion, Reality and the moving image, Hirshhorn Washington DC. 
2003 Now that part of me has become fiction, Artimo.

External links
Saskia Olde Wolbers website
Yes, these Eyes are the Windows an Artangel commission Contemporary Art Society
Artreview Saskia Olde Wolbers Artangel
Does a house in Brixton hold the key to Vincent van Gogh?
These walls had ears by Waldemar Januszczak
Saskia Olde Wolbers Q & A with Tyler Green
Deadline at Maureen Paley
The Falling Eye at the Stedelijk Museum Amsterdam
Fishing Line Never Looked So Good NY arts Magazine
Film art at the South London Gallery, BBC – collective 
Saskia Olde Wolbers wins Becks Futures
Marcus Verhagen, Saskia Olde Wolbers, Frieze, Nov–Dec 2004
Barry Schwabsky, Saskia Olde Wolbers, Tate Britain – London, ArtForum, Nov 2003
Adrian Searle, Say it with flytraps, The Guardian, May 24, 2005

1971 births
Living people
20th-century Dutch artists
21st-century Dutch artists
20th-century Dutch women artists
21st-century Dutch women artists
Dutch video artists
Dutch contemporary artists
Women video artists
Bâloise Prize winners
Academics of Camberwell College of Arts
People from Breda